Mindtree Ltd ( founded in 18 August 1999) is an Indian multinational information technology services and consulting company, headquartered in Bangalore. The Company is a part of the Larsen & Toubro Group and has employed over 38,518 employees.

The company deals in e-commerce, mobile applications, cloud computing, digital transformation, data analytics, testing, enterprise application integration and enterprise resource planning, with more than 307 active clients and 43 offices in over 18 countries, as of 31 March 2019.

History 
In August 1999, Mindtree Consulting Private Limited was founded by ten IT professionals, three of which invested through an entity incorporated in Mauritius. It was funded by the venture capital firms Walden International and Sivan Securities, and received further funding in 2001 from the Capital Group and Franklin Templeton.

It became a public company on 12 December 2006, and was listed on the Bombay Stock Exchange and National Stock Exchange. Its IPO debuted on 9 February 2007, and closed on 14 February 2007. The IPO was oversubscribed by more than a hundred times. Mindtree announced a new brand identity and logo, with the slogan "Welcome to possible" on 28 September 2012.

In 2012, Mindtree setup its first U.S. delivery center (USDC) in Gainesville, Florida, under the leadership of Scott Staples, co-founder and Global Head of Sales. As of 2017, the company has 43 offices in over 17 countries.

Larsen & Toubro (L&T), an infrastructure major and one of the largest conglomerates in India, took over control of Mindtree in June 2019 and currently has a 61.08% stake in the company. L&T's take over of Mindtree was described at the time as the first hostile takeover in the Indian IT industry.

In March 2020, Mindtree announced the appointment of Dayapatra Nevatia as COO with immediate effect. He joins the company from Accenture where he was the managing director as well as the director for delivery for advanced technology centers in India.

In April 2022, speculation arose that Mindtree and Larsen & Toubro Infotech will be merged. The combined entity was named LTIMindtree after official merger in November 2022. In December 2022, LTIMindtree had a Market cap of Rs.1,29,369.32 crore.

Services 

Mindtree works in Application Development and Maintenance, Data Analytics, Digital Services, Enterprise Application Integration and Business Process Management, Engineering R&D, Enterprise Application Services, Testing, and Infrastructure Management Services.

The company offers various research and development services including Bluetooth Solutions, Digital Video Surveillance, an integrated test methodology called MindTest, an IT infrastructure management and service platform called MWatch, the application management service, Atlas, SAP Insurance and OmniChannel.

Mindtree's business is structured around clients in verticals such as Banking, Capital Markets, Consumer Devices & Electronics, Consumer Packed Goods, Independent Software Vendors, Manufacturing, Insurance, Media & Entertainment, Retail, Semiconductors and the Travel and Hospitality industry.

Mindtree's workforce includes thousands of employees who serve as Microsoft Azure outsourced support agents.

Employees 
Mindtree has a total of 23,814 employees as of March 2021, of which 32% were women. Its workforce consists of employees from over 80 nationalities working from various offices around the globe. Out of its total workforce, 95% are software professionals and remaining 5% work in support and sales.

Acquisitions

Subsidiaries

Philanthropy 
Mindtree Foundation is a unit of Mindtree that works towards improving the lives of people with disabilities and the enhancement in the quality of primary education. Mindtree Foundation was incorporated on 20 November 2007, under section 25 of Companies Act. Mindtree's employees, assistive technologies and associations with NGOs led to the following:
 The launch of 'Udaan', a scholarship program to support the medical education of underprivileged students in association with Narayana Hrudayalaya Charitable Trust.
 The launch of 'I Got Garbage', a cloud-based platform aimed to simplify waste management and transform every waste picker in Bengaluru, India, into an entrepreneur through a structured and governed waste management framework.
 Individual Social Responsibility – Employees join the cause of donation of old clothes/toys/books, distribution of solar lanterns, caring for the elderly, cleaning up the city, blood and organ donation.

See also

 Mahindra Satyam
 List of Indian IT companies
 Software industry in Karnataka

References

External links 
 

Information technology companies of Bangalore
International information technology consulting firms
Multinational companies headquartered in India
Outsourcing companies
Outsourcing in India
Software companies based in Mumbai
Software companies established in 1999
Information technology companies of Bhubaneswar
Indian brands
2019 mergers and acquisitions
1999 establishments in Karnataka
Larsen & Toubro
Companies listed on the National Stock Exchange of India
Companies listed on the Bombay Stock Exchange